Caloptilia fribergensis is a moth of the family Gracillariidae. It is found from France, Germany, Poland and central Russia south to the Iberian Peninsula, Italy and North Macedonia.

The larvae feed on Acer monspessulanum and Acer pseudoplatanus. They mine the leaves of their host plant. The mine starts as an epidermal corridor, that later turns into a blotch and in the end becomes a small triangular full depth blotch, generally in a vein axle. Older larvae leave the mine and continue living freely. In small leaves, the larva may be found in a leaf cone. In larger leaves, it can be found under a folded leaf segment. Pupation takes place in a yellowish, transparent cocoon.

References

fribergensis
Moths of Europe
Moths described in 1871